Taguchi (written:  lit. "rice field mouth") is a Japanese surname. Notable people with the surname include:

, Japanese speed skater
, Japanese engineer and statistician
, Japanese writer
, Japanese voice actress
, Japanese singer-songwriter, actor and model
, Japanese footballer
, Japanese rally driver
, Japanese handball player
, Japanese baseball player
, Japanese actor
Kumi Taguchi (disambiguation), multiple people
, Japanese swimmer
, Japanese baseball player
, Japanese footballer
, Japanese swimmer
Paul Yashigoro Taguchi (1902–1978), Japanese cardinal
, Japanese boxer
, Japanese professional wrestler
Sherrie Gong Taguchi, American writer
, Japanese basketball player
, Japanese actor
, Japanese baseball player
, Japanese footballer
, Japanese footballer
Takashi Taguchi (disambiguation), multiple people
, Japanese actor, film director and musician
, Japanese historian and economist
, Japanese woman kidnapped by North Korea
, Japanese footballer and manager

Fictional characters
Ryō Taguchi in the Sweet Home film and video game

Japanese-language surnames